Robin Alexis (born  in New Hampshire) is a radio and reality television personality, author, Reiki practitioner, and psychic from the state of Washington. Her live call-in show Mystic Radio with Robin Alexis has been broadcast weekly since 2005, and as of 2017 is broadcast from KKNW in the Seattle market. She appeared on the television program The Real L Word as a metaphysical mother,  which she describes as "speak[ing] to the souls of babies who haven't been conceived yet, who are in the womb, or are newborns...supporting parent's  relationships with their yet unborn, lost, and aborted children". Alexis gained note from press in the United States and from Merseyside Skeptics Society in the United Kingdom when she announced in 2010 that her metaphysical mothering included counseling a couple on hosting the reincarnation of Michael Jackson. She received a trademark on the term "metaphysical mothering" in 2011.

She was a guest star on the third episode of Jimmy Kimmel Live in 2003.

Personal life
Alexis is married to Bob Bordonaro and has two children. She is an alumna of Plymouth State University in New Hampshire.

References

Bibliography

External links

1955 births
Channellers
Living people
Reiki practitioners
American spiritual mediums
Radio personalities from Washington (state)
Radio personalities from California
People from New Hampshire
People from Port Angeles, Washington
Religion in the Pacific Northwest
Plymouth State University alumni